Tamás Kovács may refer to:

Tamás Kovács (judoka) (born 1978), Hungarian judoka
Tamás Kovács (jurist) (1940–2020), Chief Prosecutor of Hungary (2006–2010)
Tamás Kovács (fencer) (born 1943), Hungarian Olympic fencer
Tamás Kovács (athlete) (born 1983), Hungarian Olympic long-distance runner